Santissimo Salvatore ("Holy Saviour", or  Badia Grande) is a Catholic church located in  Alcamo, in the province of Trapani.

Description 
This church, adjoining the nunnery of Badia Grande (today a grammar school) was already existing in 1300, it was rebuilt then in the middle of the 16th century and in the years 1690–97. it was restored in 1737 and embellished with stuccoes.
Very interesting are the classical façade, with portals in the windows, and its square bell-tower, with four pointed arches.

The church was closed for several years because of the damages suffered during the 1968 Belice earthquake. Until some years ago, every Wednesday evening they celebrated the Holy Mass in Latin, accompanied by the Gregorian chant and polyphonic ones of the del choir Jacopone da Todi. Inside the Church there are cultural activities connected with the sacred chants, the old one in particular, thanks to the same choir that uses this building on Sunday afternoon and on Wednesday evening.

Works 
The church has one nave with a barrel vault and five altars.
Inside it there are beautiful works of great artistic value, among which ten stucco statues:
 Two great angels in the  presbitery and eight allegorical statues on the walls (Religion, Faith, Patience, Renounce to World, Vigilance, Happiness, Charity and Hope) made by Serpotta's pupil, Bartolomeo Sanseverino (1758). 
 The Transfiguration of Jesus (1759–60), a painting on the high altar 
 saint Benedict among a group of saints, a fresco on the vault by Carlo Brunetti 
 the sacrificial Lamb among Angels, a fresco on the vault by Carlo Brunetti 
 Saint Benedict of Nursia, a marble statue realized by Antonino Gagini (1545) 
 The Ecstasy of Saint Teresa, assigned to  Pietro Novelli, on the first right altar 
 The Assumption of Mary, assigned to Pietro Novelli, on the first left altar
 The Annunciation: oval paintings by Baldassare Massa
In 1982 the ovals of the Annunciation were stolen, together with the high reliefs of saint Michael the Archangel and with saint John Baptist, one of them was bought again at  Sotheby's auction in 1994 for 25 million liras.

The Tabernacle 
The marble  tabernacle, in high relief and about four metres high, was made by Antonino Gagini and  Baldassare Massa (1557–1558).

She made Baldassare Massa (a sculptor from Palermo) complete the work started by  Gagini and inserted seven scenes of the Passion of Jesus, two oval paintings representing saint Benedict and the Redeemer, and a depiction of God the Father with his open arms. 
The marble tabernacle of the Holy Sacrament was later gilded by Giovan Leonardo Bagolino, a painter from Verona and Sebastiano Bagolino’s father.

Nunnery 
The sisters of the nunnery came from noble families; besides religious practices, they created works of sacred handicraft such as plastic polish and ceroplastics, and probably vestments.
To avoid the suppression of the convent, owing to the 1866 Laws, they opened a school from  1862 onwards; in fact the sisters administrated a College for Civil Damsels with three classes working inside it; besides reading and writing correctly, they devoted themselves to embroidery, the study of arithmetics, geography and Italian. In the final year they studied history, music and French; the boarding fee also included  books, equipment and any medical care.

The convent was suppressed in 1906: the remaining nuns were moved to the nunnery of Badia Nuova, and the premises were first used as barracks, then as schools (primary, nursery  and training  school). 
Today they are utilised by the secondary school "Pietro Maria Rocca".

See also 
 Giacomo Serpotta
 Pietro Novelli
 Badia Nuova 
 Chiesa dei santi Cosma e Damiano (Alcamo)
 Chiesa del santo Angelo Custode

References

Sources 
 Carlo Cataldo: Guida storico-artistica dei beni culturali di Alcamo-Calatafimi-Castellammare Golfo p. 43–44; Sarograf, Alcamo,1982 
 Gianni Guadalupi, Mariano Coppola: Alcamo, introduzione di Vincenzo Regina(collana Grand Tour); Grafiche Mazzucchelli, Milano,1995
 Carlo Cataldo: La conchiglia di S.Giacomo p. 226; ed.Campo, Alcamo, 2001

External links 
 https://web.archive.org/web/20150123034403/http://www.trapaniplus.it/schedacosedavedere.php?cosadavedere=141
 http://www.weagoo.com/it/card/13545/chiesa-del-ss-salvatore
 http://www.alqamah.it/2013/06/17/tela-del-700-restaurata-tornera-nella-chiesa-del-ss-salvatore-di-alcamo/
 https://web.archive.org/web/20161011221304/http://www.cricd.it/files/resources/201106170939550.17.06%20-%20Ad%20Alcamo%20chiesa%20riapre%20dopo%2043%20anni.pdf
 http://www.diocesi.trapani.it/content/view/1386/248/
 http://www.alqamah.it/2013/06/17/tela-del-700-restaurata-tornera-nella-chiesa-del-ss-salvatore-di-alcamo/
 http://www.larisaccamensiletrapanese.it/wp/?p=1265
 https://web.archive.org/web/20160827184723/http://www.sicilianelcuore.net/comune/alcamo.html
 http://www.diocesi.trapani.it/component/option,com_wrapper/Itemid,225/|Orari di apertura al pubblico per le Sante Messe

Roman Catholic churches in Alcamo